James Marcus Holzemer (born August 30, 1935) is a former member of the Ohio House of Representatives.

References

1935 births
Living people
Members of the Ohio House of Representatives